Danilo Gaeta (born 9 March 1999) is an Italian footballer who plays as a midfielder for  club Cavese.

Career
He made his Serie B debut for Salernitana on 12 May 2018 in a game against Foggia.

On 1 July 2018, he joined Serie C club Paganese on a one-year loan. On 31 July 2019, he returned to Paganese on a permanent basis, signing a 3-year contract.

On 11 August 2021, he moved to Fidelis Andria.

On 16 August 2022, Gaeta signed with Cavese in Serie D.

References

External links
 
 

1999 births
Living people
People from Avellino
Footballers from Campania
Italian footballers
Association football midfielders
Serie B players
Serie C players
Serie D players
U.S. Salernitana 1919 players
Paganese Calcio 1926 players
S.S. Fidelis Andria 1928 players
Cavese 1919 players
Sportspeople from the Province of Avellino